The Soling Three Person Keelboat was sailed at the 2000 Summer Olympics held from 17 to 30 September 2000 in Sydney, Australia. The series started as a fleet race and then switched to match racing for the twelve best crew. 16 crews from 16 countries competed on 16 boats with a total of 48 sailors.

The Norwegian crew of Herman Horn Johannessen, Paul Davis and Espen Stokkeland finished first in the fleet racing stage, while Danish crew of Jesper Bank, Henrik Blakskjær and Thomas Jacobsen won the Olympic gold medal by beating the German crew of 1996 champion helmsman Jochen Schümann, Gunnar Bahr and Ingo Borkowski with 4–3 in the final series. Norway won the bronze medal through beating the Netherlands with 3–1 in matches.

Results

Fleet race
Points are assigned based on the finishing position in each race (1 for first, 2 for second, etc.).  The points are totalled from the top 10 results of the 11 races, with lower totals being better.  If a sailor was disqualified or did not complete the race, 26 points are assigned for that race (as there were 25 sailors in this competition).

Match race

Round robin 1

Round robin 2

Quarter-finals

Semi-finals

Match for third place

Final

References

Sources
 Results and weather take from https://web.archive.org/web/20050825083600/http://www.sailing.org/olympics2000/info2000/
 ; sports-reference

Tornado
Olympic Soling Regattas